The qualification for the 2010 European Baseball Championship was held from July 7–12, 2008 in Croatia, Czech Republic and Slovakia, and July 9–12, 2008 in Belgium and Portugal. 23 nations contested to qualify for 5 spots available among the 7 other sides already qualified. In the end, Belgium, Croatia, Czech Republic, Greece and Ukraine qualified to compete in the 2010 competition, to be placed with the 7 already qualified teams from the 2007 competition. These are, France, Germany, Great Britain, Italy, Netherlands, Spain and Sweden.

Qualifier Pool 1

Group stage

Final (best of 3)

Qualifier Pool 2

Group stage

Final (best of 3)

Qualifier Pool 3

Group stage

Final (best of 3)

Qualifier Pool 4

Group stage

Final (best of 3)

Qualifier Pool 5

Group stage

3rd place

Final (best of 3)

External links
Game Results Pool Trnava
Game Results Pool Prague
Game Results Pool Karlovac
Game Results Pool Abrantes
Game Results Pool Antwerp

References

Qualifier for 2010 European Baseball Championship
European Baseball Championship – Qualification
International baseball competitions hosted by Belgium
International baseball competitions hosted by the Czech Republic
2008 in Belgian sport
European Baseball Championship qualification
Baseball in Croatia
European Baseball Championship qualification
Sports competitions in Antwerp
2000s in Antwerp
International sports competitions hosted by Portugal
International sports competitions hosted by Slovakia
Baseball in Portugal
European Baseball Championship qualification
European Baseball Championship qualification
European Baseball Championship qualification